Newark was a Municipal Borough in Nottinghamshire, England from 1835 to 1974. It was created under the Municipal Corporations Act 1835.

The borough was abolished in 1974 under the Local Government Act 1972 and combined with Newark Rural District and Southwell Rural District to form the new Newark and Sherwood district.

References

Districts of England abolished by the Local Government Act 1972
Municipal boroughs of Nottinghamshire
Municipal Borough of